The Best of Gary B.B. Coleman is a compilation album by American bluesman Gary B.B. Coleman. The album was released in 1991 by Ichiban Records label and contains 12 compositions from previous Coleman's releases.

Reception
Niles J. Frantz of AllMusic wrote "This is a good career overview, though it does expose a certain lack of originality and diversity."

Track listing

References

1991 albums
Gary B. B. Coleman albums
Ichiban Records albums